Veľké Hincovo pleso is the biggest and deepest mountain lake of glacial origin in the High Tatras, Slovakia. Its surface remains frozen for around 270 days per year.

References 

Lakes of Slovakia
Lakes of the High Tatras
Spiš
Glacial lakes
Geography of Prešov Region